Hungry Hill may refer to:


Places 
 Hungry Hill, a hill in County Cork, Ireland
 A neighborhood in Springfield, Massachusetts, United States

Arts and entertainment 
 Hungry Hill (novel), a 1943 novel by Daphne du Maurier
 Hungry Hill (film), a 1947 film adaptation of the novel

Other uses 
 Battle of Hungry Hill, an 1855 battle between the United States Army and militia against the Rogue River Indians

See also 
 Hunger Hill (disambiguation)